Timothy Francis Clement-Jones, Baron Clement-Jones,  (born 26 October 1949) is a Liberal Democrat Peer and spokesman for the digital economy in the House of Lords.

Lord Clement-Jones is a consultant of the global law firm DLA Piper, and formerly held positions including: London managing partner (2011–2016); head of UK government affairs; chairman of its China and Middle East Desks; international business relations partner; and co-chairman of global government relations.

He is chair of Ombudsman Services Limited, the not-for-profit independent ombudsman service that provides dispute resolution for the communications, energy, property and copyright licensing industries. He is a member of the advisory board of the Association of Insurance and Risk Managers in Industry and Commerce (Airmic) and board member of the Corporate Finance Faculty of the Institute of Chartered Accountants in England and Wales (ICAEW).

He is a member of the Saudi–Britain Joint business Council, a Law Society Ambassador to the City of London and an Icebreaker Fellow and vice-president of the 48 Group Club, a business network which promotes links with China.

Clement-Jones was group company secretary and legal adviser of Kingfisher Plc from 1986 until 1995, where he coordinated Kingfisher's contribution to the Shopping Hours Reform Campaign which led to the  Sunday Trading Act 1994.  Before Kingfisher, Clement-Jones held senior legal positions at Grand Metropolitan, now Diageo plc (legal director, Grand Metropolitan Retailing 1984–1986) and London Weekend Television (head of legal services 1980–1983), now part of ITV plc.

Clement-Jones is a former non-executive chairman of the Context Group (1997–2005), the environmental strategy and communications consultancy and former director of Political Context, the political communications consultancy (1996–1999).

Political
Clement-Jones was chairman of the Association of Liberal Lawyers 1982–1986 and then of the Liberal Party from 1986 to 1988 and played a major part in the merger with the Social Democratic Party to form the Liberal Democrats.  He was made CBE for political services in 1988.  He was the chairman of the Liberal Democrats Finance Committee from 1989 to 1998 and federal treasurer of the Liberal Democrats from 2005 to 2010.
Clement-Jones was created a life peer taking the title Baron Clement-Jones, of Clapham in the London Borough of Lambeth on 17 July 1998 and until July 2004 was the Liberal Democrat health spokesman and thereafter until 2010 Liberal Democrat spokesman on culture, media and sport, in the House of Lords.  He is the Liberal Democrat spokesman for the digital economy and a former spokesman on the creative industries (2015–2017).

He is chair of the House of Lords Select Committee on Artificial Intelligence (2017–2018) and a former member of the Select Committees on Communications (2011–2015) and the Built Environment (2015–2016).  He is co-chairman of the All-Party Parliamentary Group on Artificial Intelligence.  He is deputy chairman of the All-Party Parliamentary Group on China and vice chairman of the All-Party Parliamentary Groups for Iraqi-Kurdistan, Ovarian Cancer, Publishing, Writers and Intellectual Property.  Since 2012, he has been the chair of Lib Dems in Communications.

He introduced and ensured the passage through the House of Lords of the 2003 Tobacco and Advertising and Sponsorship Act and the Live Music Act 2012.

Education, Charitable and Voluntary

He is honorary president of Ambitious About Autism (formerly Treehouse), an autism education charity and school for children with autism and other communication disorders, and its former chairman (2001–2008).
Clement-Jones is chair of the council of Queen Mary University of London and former chair of the council of the School of Pharmacy, University of London (2008–2012) before its merger with University College London, whereupon he was an external member of the council of University College London and chair of its audit committee from 2012 to 2017. 
 
He is a member of the advisory board of the College of Medicine and an honorary Fellow of the School of Pharmacy, University College London.

Clement-Jones is a council member of the Heart of the City; Fellow of the Public Relations Consultants Association and honorary Fellow of the Chartered Institute of Public Relations; he is a governor of Haileybury and an ambassador for Barts Charity.  He is a former trustee of the Barbican Centre Trust (2012–2016) and former chair of Crime Concern (1991–1995).  Until its merger with Macmillan Cancer Support in 2008, he was a trustee of Cancerbackup, the UK cancer information charity founded by his late wife, Dr Vicky Clement-Jones FRCP. 
 
He is patron of Attitude is Everything; Music Venue Trust and 2020Health.

Family and education
He is the son of Maurice Llewelyn Clement-Jones and (Margaret) Jean, née Hudson. Educated Haileybury and Imperial Service College and Trinity College, Cambridge (economics). In 1973, he wed Vicky Veronica Yip, who died in 1987. He married, secondly, in 1994, to Jean Roberta Whiteside.

Arms

References

External links
Lord Clement-Jones at the Parliament website

1949 births
Living people
Alumni of Trinity College, Cambridge
Liberal Democrats (UK) life peers
Chairs of the Liberal Party (UK)
Commanders of the Order of the British Empire
People educated at Haileybury and Imperial Service College
Life peers created by Elizabeth II